Brushy Mountain State Penitentiary last named  Brushy Mountain Correctional Complex (also called Brushy) was a large maximum-security prison in the town of Petros in Morgan County, Tennessee, operated by the Tennessee Department of Correction. It was established in 1896 and operated until 2009. The grounds of the prison are now included in part of the Barkley Marathons.

History
Brushy Mountain State Penitentiary opened in 1896 in the aftermath of the Coal Creek War, an 1891 lockout of coal miners that took place in Coal Creek and Briceville, Tennessee, after miners protested the use of unpaid convict leasing in the mines. This labor conflict was eventually resolved in favor of the coal miners, with a bill passing the Tennessee state legislature to abolish the convict labor system, to be replaced by the Brushy Mountain Mine and Prison.  The mountainous, secure site was located with the help of consulting geologists, and Brushy Mountain convicts built a railroad spur, worked the coal mines on site, operated coke ovens, or farmed.  At the end of all the state's convict lease arrangements on January 1, 1896, some 210 of those prisoners became the first inmates of Brushy Mountain.

The original prison was a wooden structure also built by prisoner labor. It was replaced in the 1920s with a castle-like building constructed from stone mined by prisoners from a quarry on the property. As of 2008 Brushy Mountain was the oldest operating prison in Tennessee.

The prison is nearly encircled by rugged wooded terrain in a remote section of the Cumberland Plateau, adjacent to Frozen Head State Park and Natural Area. Escape attempts were infrequent and almost always unsuccessful. Perhaps the best-known escape attempt occurred on June 10, 1977, when James Earl Ray, the assassin of Martin Luther King Jr., escaped with six other inmates by climbing over a fence.  Ray was captured less than 58 hours later in rugged mountain terrain 8 miles from the prison.
The prison was closed in 1972 after a strike by prison guards protesting unsafe working conditions. It reopened in 1976.  Brushy Mountain was the only unionized prison in the state.  The union worked closely with state legislators to improve the working conditions for correctional staff across the state. Under governor Lamar Alexander attempts were made to squeeze the union out of existence but his efforts were fruitless.  Additional attempts over the years were attempted but they proved fruitless also.  Many efforts to close the prison were attempted long before the 2009 closure. In 1998 Brushy Mountain Prison was administratively joined with Morgan County Correctional Complex.  With the joining of the two institutions both prisons became unionized.

In the 1980s Brushy Mountain ended its long-standing function as a maximum security prison and assumed a mission as a classification facility. In its final operations, it had a capacity of 584 and was used as the state's reception/classification and diagnostic center for East Tennessee. It housed all custody levels of inmates, although it retained a maximum security designation due to the ninety six bed maximum security annex contained within the prison walls.  These ninety six beds were used to house the state's most troublesome inmates. The last warden was Jim Worthington.

The prison closed June 11, 2009. Its functions were transferred to the Morgan County Correctional Complex. In 2018, Brushy Mountain was re-opened to the public for tours, private events, car shows, and concerts. Brushy also houses a distillery that produces moonshine, vodka, whisky, and liqueurs.

Notable inmates
In addition to James Earl Ray, the convicted assassin of Martin Luther King Jr., notable inmates included Byron Looper, who was convicted in 2000 for the murder of State Senator Tommy Burks and began serving his life sentence at Brushy Mountain.  George Hyatte, one of the perpetrators of the 2005 Kingston courthouse shooting, was imprisoned at Brushy Mountain at the time of that incident.

Fictional

A notable, albeit fictional, occasional inmate is Otis Lee Crenshaw, the trailer-dwelling country music singer created by comedian Rich Hall.

Another fictional inmate was Ray McDeere, the brother of protagonist Mitch McDeere, in the novel The Firm.

In the novel The Silence of the Lambs, Dr. Hannibal Lecter makes a deal in which he is to be transferred to the prison in exchange for information about the serial killer Buffalo Bill that would enable authorities to rescue his latest victim, Catherine Martin, the daughter of junior state senator Ruth Martin.  His information was later proven false by Clarice Starling and he escapes before he arrives at the prison.

In the 1979 novel Suttree by Cormac McCarthy, the title character's friend, Gene Harrogate, is sentenced to a three-year prison term at Brushy Mountain after being caught burglarizing a store.

In singer John Hiatt's 1988 song "Tennessee Plates" the main character laments "This ain't no hotel I'm writing you from/No, it's the Tennessee Prison up in Brushy Mountain...Yours sincerly's doin' 5-to-8/Just stampin' out my time making Tennessee plates."

The leading track of the 2014 album, Remedy, by Old Crow Medicine Show is entitled "Brushy Mountain Conjugal Trailer". The album's cover is the state flag of Tennessee.

References

External links
Brushy Mountain State Penitentiary Now open for tours, private events, concerts, and moonshine distillery.
Brushy Mountain Correctional Complex page on Tennessee Department of Corrections website (archived)
 Lindsay Ziliak, Brushy Mountain inmates transferred as prison shuts down after 113 years, Knoxville News Sentinel, June 8, 2009. Includes a video of the prison and its grounds.

Defunct prisons in Tennessee
Buildings and structures in Morgan County, Tennessee
1896 establishments in Tennessee
2009 disestablishments in Tennessee